The Vote of No Addresses was a measure passed on 17 January 1648 by the English Long Parliament when it broke off negotiations with King Charles I. The vote was in response to the news that Charles I was entering into an engagement with the Scots. Cromwell in particular urged that no new negotiations be opened with Charles and the vote was carried by 141 to 91. This led to the support of the general council on 8 January and a hitherto reluctant House of Lords convening a committee to approve it on 13 January.

By September 1648 the Second Civil War had been fought and the Royalists, the English Presbyterians, and their Scottish allies had been defeated by the New Model Army at Preston. The Army, now in the ascendancy, wished to resume negotiations with the king so Parliament repealed the measure in September 1648.

See also
The failed Treaty of Newport September 1648.

References

Further reading
William Godwin (1826). History of the Commonwealth of England: From Its Commencement, to the Restoration of Charles the Second, Volume 2,  Chapter XVI,  H. Colburn,  pp. 492–496.
Stanley Leathes  et al (1910). The Cambridge modern history, Volume 12, CUP Archive. pp. 347–353

English Civil War
1648 in England